Ives is a crater on Mercury. Its name was adopted by the International Astronomical Union (IAU) in 1979. Ives is named for the American composer Charles Ives, who lived from 1874 to 1954.

Ives has a bright ray system.

References

Impact craters on Mercury